Deyes is a surname. Notable people with the surname include:

Alfie Deyes (born 1993), English vlogger and writer
George Deyes (1879–1963), English cricketer

See also
Reyes (name)

English-language surnames